Yash Vijay Dhull (born 11 November 2002) is an Indian cricketer. He made his first-class cricket debut for the Delhi cricket team in the 2021–22 Ranji Trophy in February 2022, scoring two centuries on debut as an opening batsman. He has played for the India national under-19 cricket team, including in India's winning side at the 2022 ICC Under-19 Cricket World Cup and 2021 ACC Under-19 Asia Cup captaining the side in both tournaments.

Career
Yash Dhull was born and raised in New Delhi. He started playing cricket at the age of 11. Dhull has led the Delhi Under-14 and Under-16 cricket teams.

In December 2021, Dhull was named as the captain of India's team for the 2022 ICC Under-19 Cricket World Cup in the West Indies. In the Super League semi-final match against Australia, Dhull scored 110 runs, with India progressing to the final of the tournament. Following the conclusion of the tournament, Dhull was named as the captain of the International Cricket Council's (ICC) team of the tournament.

Dhull played under-19 cricket for Delhi. He made his first-clas debut on 17 February 2022 against Tamil Nadu in the Ranji Trophy, scoring a century in both of his innings in the match. Before making his senior debut, Dhull had been bought by Delhi Capitals in the 2022 IPL auction ahead of the 2022 Indian Premier League. Dhull finished the 2021–22 Ranji Trophy as Delhi's highest run scorer, scoring a total of 479 runs at an average of 119.75. This included three centuries, the last of which was an unbeaten double hundred against Chhattisgarh.

References

External links
 

2002 births
Living people
Indian cricketers
Cricketers from Delhi
Delhi cricketers